Rowan William Gillachrist Moore (born 22 March 1961) is an architecture critic.

Biography
Moore was born on 22 March 1961. His brother is the journalist, newspaper editor and Margaret Thatcher's official biographer Charles 
Moore, Baron Moore of Etchingham, and his grandfather was the second Baronet Moore, Sir Alan Hilary Moore.

Rowan Moore's parents were Ann (nee Miles), who was a county councillor for the Liberal Party in Sussex, and Richard Moore, who was a leader writer for the national newspaper the News Chronicle and political secretary to the leader of the Liberal Party. He unsuccessfully stood for a seat as a Liberal Party MP at several general elections.

Rowan Moore was educated at Eton and the University of Cambridge, where he studied architecture. After briefly practising, he turned to journalism. He was editor of the architecture journal Blueprint, architecture editor of Evening Standard (London) and also wrote for The Guardian. 

In 2002 Moore succeeded Lucy Musgrave as director of the Architecture Foundation and resigned in 2008 amid speculation that the failure of a commission for Zaha Hadid to design new headquarters for the institution had left "everyone disappointed and angry".

Thereafter Moore concentrated on journalism and was appointed to the post of architecture critic of The Observer in February 2010. He was named critic of the year in the 2014 British Press Awards.

Selected works 

 Panoramas of London (1993)
 Struktur, Raum Und Haut (1995)
 The New Art Gallery Walsall (2000)
 Building Tate Modern: Herzog & De Meuron (2000)
 Why We Build (2012)
 Anatomy of a Building (2014)
 Slow Burn City: London in the Twenty-First Century (2016)

References

External links
Sudjic, Deyan. "Britain needs to see stars," The Guardian (16 June 2002).
Rowan Moore | The Guardian

Year of birth missing (living people)
Living people
British male journalists
Architecture critics
20th-century British architects
British writers